The 2017–18 Guadeloupe Division of Honor is the 67th season of the Guadeloupe Division of Honor, the top tier of association football in Guadeloupe. The season began on 2 September 2017 and ended on 30 May 2018.

League table
Note: 4 points for a win, 2 points for a draw, 1 point for a defeat.

References

 Guadeloupe Division of Honor on RSSSF
 Guadeloupe Division of Honor on Soccerway

2017–18 in Caribbean football leagues
2017 in Guadeloupe
2018 in Guadeloupe
2017-18